Manfred Böckl (born 2 September 1948) is a German writer who specialises in historical fiction. Since the 1980s, he has written novels that often revolve around Bavaria, crime, abuse of power and historical renegades and seers. He had a local breakthrough in 1991 with a novel about the Bavarian prophet Mühlhiasl. A recurring subject in Böckl's works is Celtic culture and he practices Celtic neopaganism.

Early life and education
Manfred Böckl was born in Landau an der Isar in Bavaria on 2 September 1948. He had a Catholic father and an Evangelical mother. He studied German studies, geography, jurisprudence, history, philosophy, literature, psychology and theology at the University of Regensburg without finishing a degree. From 1973 to 1976 he worked as an editor at the Passauer Neue Presse and after that as a freelance writer.

Literary career
Böckl debuted as a writer in 1966 when he had a novella published. From 1980 to 1984, he published a series of young adult novels, Geheimbund Blaue Rose, written together with Helmut Watzke under the pseudonym Jean de Laforet. Since 1984 he has written a large number of historical novels, often set in Bavaria and revolving around crimes and abuse of power. He describes his approach to the genre as trying to intervene socially with lessons from history.

Die Hexe soll brennen (1989), set in the Regensburg and Straubing area, is about witch-hunts, a theme that also appears in novels about Agnes Bernauer (1993) and the witch trial of Fuersteneck (1997). A recurring subject is Bavarian prophets, including Mühlhiasl, who is the central character in the 1991 novel Mühlhiasl. Der Seher vom Rabenstein which became a literary breakthrough for Böckl in Bavaria; as of 2021, it had been published in 10 German editions. It was followed by several novels and non-fiction books about clairvoyants and seers. The history of Bavarian glassworks form part of the novels Sumava. Ein Epos aus dem Böhmerwald (1992) and Der Glasteufel (2002). In Bischofsmord und Hexenjagd. Die spektakulärsten Kriminalfälle aus dem historischen Bayern (2015), Böckl combines his interest in Bavaria and historical crimes and explores the conspiracy theory that Ludwig II of Bavaria was murdered.

Another recurring subject is the Celts and their culture, including Myrddin Wyllt, Boudica, the triple goddess and the druids. Böckl practices Celtic neopaganism in a form he describes as a "spiritual return to Celtic paganism". He explores contemporary religious life and issues of tolerance and fundamentalism in his 2011 book Die kleinen Religionen Europas.

As of 2016, Böckl's books had sold around one million copies in total. He has had books translated into Italian, Portuguese, Russian, Estonian, Czech, Bulgarian and Dutch. In 2018, on the occasion of his 70th birthday, he published his autobiography Oft war es wie im Roman. In 2019 he publicly denounced Germany's immigration policies under Angela Merkel's government.

Selected publications
Novels
 
 
 
 
 
 
 
 
 
 
 
 
 

Non-fiction

References

Further reading

External links
 Personal website 

1948 births
Living people
People from Dingolfing-Landau
Writers from Bavaria
20th-century German novelists
21st-century German novelists
20th-century German non-fiction writers
21st-century German non-fiction writers
German male novelists
German male non-fiction writers
German crime fiction writers
German historical novelists
German modern pagans
Modern pagan novelists
Writers of historical fiction set in antiquity
Writers of historical fiction set in the Middle Ages
Writers of historical fiction set in the early modern period
Writers of historical fiction set in the modern age